The 2021 Denmark Open (officially known as the Victor Denmark Open 2021 for sponsorship reasons) was a badminton tournament which took place at the Odense Sports Park in Odense, Denmark, from 19 to 24 October 2021 and had a total prize of US$850,000. 

The tournament which originally was a Super 750 event later got upgraded to a Super 1000 event in 2021.

Tournament
The 2021 Denmark Open was the fifth tournament according to the 2021 BWF World Tour as many tournaments got canceled due to the COVID-19 pandemic. It was a part of the Denmark Open, which had been held since 1935. This tournament was organized by Badminton Denmark with sanction from the BWF.

Venue
This international tournament was held at the Odense Sports Park in Odense, Denmark.

Point distribution 
Below is the point distribution table for each phase of the tournament based on the BWF points system for the BWF World Tour Super 1000 event.

Prize money 
The total prize money for this tournament was US$850,000. Distribution of prize money was in accordance with BWF regulations.

Men's singles

Seeds 

 Kento Momota (final)
 Viktor Axelsen (champion)
 Anders Antonsen (second round)
 Chou Tien-chen (quarter-finals)
 Anthony Sinisuka Ginting (first round)
 Jonatan Christie (quarter-finals)
 Lee Zii Jia (quarter-finals)
 Ng Ka Long (second round)

Finals

Top half

Section 1

Section 2

Bottom half

Section 3

Section 4

Women's singles

Seeds 

 Chen Yufei (withdrew)
 Akane Yamaguchi (champion)
 Ratchanok Intanon (first round)
 P. V. Sindhu (quarter-finals)
 An Se-young (final)
 He Bingjiao (semi-finals)
 Pornpawee Chochuwong (quarter-finals)
 Michelle Li (withdrew)

Finals

Top half

Section 1

Section 2

Bottom half

Section 3

Section 4

Men's doubles

Seeds 

 Marcus Fernaldi Gideon / Kevin Sanjaya Sukamuljo (second round)
 Mohammad Ahsan / Hendra Setiawan (first round)
 Lee Yang / Wang Chi-lin (second round)
 Fajar Alfian / Muhammad Rian Ardianto (quarter-finals)
 Aaron Chia / Soh Wooi Yik (second round)
 Choi Sol-gyu / Seo Seung-jae (withdrew)
 Satwiksairaj Rankireddy / Chirag Shetty (second round)
 Kim Astrup / Anders Skaarup Rasmussen (final)

Finals

Top half

Section 1

Section 2

Bottom half

Section 3

Section 4

Women's doubles

Seeds 

 Chen Qingchen / Jia Yifan (first round)
 Lee So-hee / Shin Seung-chan (final)
 Kim So-yeong / Kong Hee-yong (semi-finals)
 Greysia Polii / Apriyani Rahayu (quarter-finals)
 Jongkolphan Kititharakul / Rawinda Prajongjai (semi-finals)
 Nami Matsuyama / Chiharu Shida (first round)
 Gabriela Stoeva / Stefani Stoeva (second round)
 Chloe Birch / Lauren Smith (first round)

Finals

Top half

Section 1

Section 2

Bottom half

Section 3

Section 4

Mixed doubles

Seeds 

 Wang Yilyu / Huang Dongping (semi-finals)
 Dechapol Puavaranukroh / Sapsiree Taerattanachai (final)
 Praveen Jordan / Melati Daeva Oktavianti (semi-finals)
 Yuta Watanabe / Arisa Higashino (champions)
 Seo Seung-jae / Chae Yoo-jung (withdrew)
 Marcus Ellis / Lauren Smith (second round)
 Chan Peng Soon / Goh Liu Ying (first round)
 Hafiz Faizal / Gloria Emanuelle Widjaja (first round)

Finals

Top half

Section 1

Section 2

Bottom half

Section 3

Section 4

References

External links
 Tournament Link
 Official Website

Denmark Open
Denmark Open
Denmark Open
Denmark Open